The 2021–22 Országos Bajnokság I (also known as the E.ON Férfi OB I Bajnokság for sponsorship reasons, OB I in short), is going to be the 116th season of top-tier water polo in Hungary. A total of fourteen teams contest this season's league, which began on 8 September 2021 and will conclude in 18 May 2022.

FTC-Telekom won their twenty-fourth title.

Teams

The following 14 clubs compete in the OB I during the 2021–22 season:

Personnel and sponsors

Managerial changes

Regular season

Standings

Schedule and results
In the table below the home teams are listed on the left and the away teams along the top.

Play-offs

Championship play-offs

Semi-finals

FTC Telekom v A-Híd VasasPlaket

FTC Telekom won the series 7–1 with points ratio, and advanced to the Finals.

Szolnoki Dózsa v Genesys OSC-Újbuda

Genesys OSC-Újbuda won the series 7–1 with points ratio, and advanced to the Finals.

Finals
The Finals series were played best-of-three format, with the higher seeded team playing the first and third (if it was necessary) game at home.

|}

Game 1

Game 2

FTC-Telekom Waterpolo won the Final series 2–0.

Third place series
The Third place series were played best-of-three format, with the higher seeded team playing the first and third (if it was necessary) game at home.

|}

Game 1

Game 2

A-Híd VasasPlaket won the Third place series 2–0.

5th–8th Placement matches

5–8th place semi-finals

Fifth place series

Seventh place series

9th–12th Placement matches

9–12th place semi-finals

Ninth place series

Eleventh place series

Promotion/relegation play-offs
The Promotion/relegation play-offs series were played best-of-three format, with the higher seeded team (13th placed in OB I regular season) playing the first and third (if it was necessary) game at home.

|}
Metalcom Szentes won the 2–0 on series and therefore both clubs remain in their respective leagues.

Final standings

Sources: MVLSZ(C) Champion; (O) Play-off winner; (R) Relegated

Statistics

Top goalscorers

Number of teams by counties and regions

See also
2021 Magyar Kupa

References

External links
 Hungarian Water Polo Federaration 

Seasons in Hungarian water polo competitions
Hungary
Orszagos Bajnoksag I Men
Orszagos Bajnoksag I Men